Maud, Countess of Huntingdon ( 1074 – 1130/1131), or Matilda, was Queen of Scotland as the wife of King David I. She was the great-niece of William the Conqueror and the granddaughter of Earl Siward.

Biography 
Maud was the daughter of Waltheof, the Anglo-Saxon Earl of Huntingdon and Northampton, and his French wife Judith of Lens. Her father was the last of the major Anglo-Saxon earls to remain powerful after the Norman conquest of England in 1066, and the son of Siward, Earl of Northumbria. Her mother was the niece of William the Conqueror, which makes Maud his grand-niece. Through her ancestors the Counts of Boulogne, she was also a descendant of Alfred the Great and Charles the Bald and a cousin of Godfrey of Bouillon.

She was married to Simon de Senlis (or St Liz) in about 1090. Earlier, William had tried to get Maud's mother, Judith, to marry Simon. He received the honour of Huntingdon (whose lands stretched across much of eastern England) probably in right of his wife from William Rufus before the end of the year 1090.

She had three known children by him:
 Matilda of St Liz (Maud) (d. 1140); she married Robert Fitz Richard of Tonbridge; she married secondly Saer De Quincy.
 Simon of St Liz (d. 1153)
 Saint Waltheof of Melrose ( 1100–1159/1160)

Her first husband died some time after 1111 and Maud next married David, the brother-in-law of Henry I of England, in 1113. Through the marriage, David gained control over his wife's vast estates in England, in addition to his own lands in Cumbria and Strathclyde. They had four children (two sons and two daughters):
 Malcolm (born in 1113 or later, died young)
 Henry ( 1114–1152)
 Claricia (died unmarried)
 Hodierna (died young and unmarried)

In 1124, David became King of Scots. Maud's two sons by different fathers, Simon and Henry, would later vie for the Earldom of Huntingdon.

She died in 1130 or 1131 and was buried at Scone Abbey in Perthshire, but she appears in a charter of dubious origin dated 1147.

Depictions in fiction
Maud of Huntingdon appears as a character in Elizabeth Chadwick's novel The Winter Mantle (2003), as well as Alan Moore's novel Voice of the Fire (1995) and Nigel Tranter's novel David the Prince (1980).

References 

1070s births
1130 deaths
Maud
Maud, Countess of Huntingdon
English countesses
Medieval Scottish nobility

11th-century Scottish people
12th-century Scottish people
11th-century Scottish women
12th-century Scottish women
11th-century English women
11th-century English people
12th-century English women
12th-century English people
12th-century women rulers